Robert Hacket (born 1617) was a Scottish soldier in the Wars of the Three Kingdoms.

He was involved with the Western Association (Scotland).

As a lieutenant-colonel, he was the second-in-command of the army of the Scottish Parliament at the Battle of Carbisdale.

He later became an elder at the church in Lochhead (Cambeltown), Argyle in 1658.

References

External links
article on battle

Scottish soldiers
Elders of the Church of Scotland
1617 births